The Auxerre tragedy, as it is known in the Azerbaijani media, was a game belonging to the UEFA Euro 1996 qualifying that took place on 6 September 1995.

The game went down in the history as both the biggest defeat of the Azerbaijan national team and the biggest victory of the France national team.

Background 

This would be the 8th match for both teams in the first group of the UEFA Euro 1996 qualifying. While Azerbaijan already lost its chance to participate in the tournament, France was still fighting for a ticket. Prior to the game, France's biggest victory was 8–0, twice over Luxembourg (20 April 1913 and 17 December 1953) and against Iceland (2 June 1957). Azerbaijan had suffered its biggest defeat (0–5) in a friendly match against Malta on 19 April 1994.

Context 
The French team was in difficulty following a series of poor results, having been negatively affected by failure to qualify for the 1994 FIFA World Cup, the most recent being a 1–1 draw conceded at the Parc des Princes against Poland a few weeks earlier. As Azerbaijan was one of the weakest European selections a Les Blues victory was not in doubt. Instead, the challenge for the Blues was to reassure themselves by regaining their effectiveness on target.

Match

Details

Post-match 
After the game, France took second place with 14 points, ahead of Poland; the Azerbaijani team remained in the last place with 8 losses and 0 points. Head coach Aghasalim Mirjavadov resigned immediately after the defeat, citing the inability of the players, the low level of training and the fact that the opponent was very strong as the reasons for the defeat.

France, meanwhile, would go on finishing second place and qualified for the UEFA Euro 1996, in which France reached the semi-finals. Nearly the same crop of players, including some notable names like Zinedine Zidane, Youri Djorkaeff and Bixente Lizarazu, would go on to form the main squad in France's eventual 1998 FIFA World Cup triumph.

In 2016, pastemagazine.com included the Auxerre tragedy in its list of Top 10 Biggest National Defeats.

Final table

See also 

 UEFA Euro 1996 qualifying

References 

UEFA European Championship matches
UEFA Euro 1996 qualifying
France national football team matches
Azerbaijan national football team matches